Tanguá is a municipality located in the Brazilian state of Rio de Janeiro. It covers an area of 145,5 km².

Its population is relatively stable, with 29,481 in 2005 and 30,732 in 2010, most of them urban. This equates to a population density of 211 inhabitants per km².

The municipality contains part of the Central Rio de Janeiro Atlantic Forest Mosaic of conservation units, created in 2006.
It contains the  Serra do Barbosão Municipal Nature Park, created in 2007 to protect an area of Atlantic Forest.

References

Municipalities in Rio de Janeiro (state)